Hermann Theodor von Schmid (also Hermann Schmid; 30 March 1815 – 19 October 1880) was an Austrian-German novelist, dramatist, and theatre director.

Life
He was born in Waizenkirchen (now in Austria, but at that time still in Bavaria) and studied law at Ludwig Maximilian University of Munich, where he obtained his doctorate and entered the judiciary.

He began his literary career as a dramatist with Camoëns and Bretislav (1843), which caught the attention of the Bavarian king Ludwig I and led to a position at the court theatre. After the Revolution of 1848, his support for Johannes Ronge and the failure of his marriage caused him professional difficulties and he was obliged to retire from the service, moving into a two-storey house at the head of the Tegernseer Landstraße in the south-east of the city.

He obtained great popularity in the 1860s as a prolific writer of historical novels based on events in Austrian and Bavarian history. He was granted the Order of St Michael in 1869, the next year was appointed director of the Volkstheater on Gärtnerplatz, resigning the position after a few years. He was ennobled in 1876.

He died in Munich, where today a street bears his name.

Work
His plays, collected in 1853, include several historical dramas, such as Karl Stuart and Columbus, but his greater success was in portraying peasant life, as in Die Z'widerwurz'n (1878) and Der Tatzelwurm (1880). In his novels, too, such as Almenrausch und Edelweiss, Der Habermeister, he was at his best when describing Bavarian customs. His most ambitious work was his lyric epic Winland oder die Fahrt um's Glück (1877).

His collected works appeared in 50 volumes (Leipzig, 1873–1884).

List of works
Camoens, drama, 1843
Bretislav, drama, 1843
Karl Stuart I., tragedy, 1845
Herzog Christoph der Kämpfer, drama, 1847
Straßburg (or Eine deutsche Stadt) 1849 
Liebesring, libretto, 1847
Columbus, 1857
Fürst und Stadt (1858, later under the title Münchener Kindeln)
Huberbäuerin, 1860
Das Schwalberl, peasant novel, 1860
Theuerdank, comedy, 1861 
Alte und Neue Geschichten aus Bayern, stories, 1861
Mein Eden, novel, 1862
Die Türken in München, novel, 1862 
Der Kanzler von Tirol, novel in three volumes, 1863
Im Morgenroth, novel, 1864
Der Jägerwirth von München, novel, 1864
Almenrausch und Edelweiß, novel, 1864
Im Morgenrot. Eine Münchener Geschichte aus der Zeit Max Joseph's III, 1864 
Baierischen Geschichten aus Dorf und Stadt, stories in two volumes, 1864
Der bayrische Hiesel. Volks-Erzählung, 1865 
Friedel und Oswald, novel in three volumes, 1866
Der Tatzelwurm, folk play, 1866
Almenrausch und Edelweiß, folk play, 1867
Sankt Barthelmä, novel, 1868
Mütze und Krone, novel in five volumes, 1869
Das Münchener Kindel. Erzählung aus der Zeit des Kurfürsten Ferdinand Maria, 1874 
Concordia, novel in five volumes, 1875
Der Bauernrebell. Roman aus der Tirolergeschichte, 1876 
Winland oder die Fahrt um's Glück, lyric epic, 1876
Zum grünen Baum, novel, unfinished

Further reading

 Ingrun Klagges, Die geschichtlichen Romane Hermann v. Schmids, Würzburg (diss.), 1943.

Bibliography

Notes

Ludwig Maximilian University of Munich alumni
1815 births
1880 deaths
German male novelists
German male dramatists and playwrights
19th-century German novelists
19th-century German dramatists and playwrights
19th-century German male writers